Leona Philippo (born 6 May 1979 in Toronto) is a Canadian-born Dutch singer-songwriter of Jamaican origin. On 14 December 2012, she won the title for season 3 of the Dutch reality television music competition The Voice of Holland. She is also often credited simply as Leona.

Career
Born in Toronto, she started music very early learning the piano. When she was 6, she moved with her adoptive family to the Netherlands. In 1998, she recorded materials in Hollywood, Los Angeles made available as a demo. Later she moved back to Holland, to Rotterdam She also took part with R&B band  performing at various locations including at the Rotterdam Ahoy. She left the band after three years.

Leaving the Conservatory after three years of studies, she joined band Nits as vocalist and toured with them in their Wool Tour in 2000 performing throughout Europe and in Japan.

In 2001, Philippo starred in Aida, a musical directed by Joop van den Ende. She also took part in a string of musical stage acts, notably : A Tribute to the Girl Groups, and in A Tribute to The Blues Brothers.

In 2004–2005, she appeared in Dutch television series Het glazen huis in a leading role of Bibi Kruyswijk. She was also in backing vocals for a number of touring artists including Trijntje Oosterhuis, Total Touch, Kane and Candy Dulfer. In 2008, she also made guest appearances during  concert of Lionel Richie.

In 2009, her single "Shake Ya Tailfeather" was promoted as Radio 501 favourite upcoming hit.

In 2011, she returned to musical stage theatre with A Tribute to Michael Jackson and in The Songs from the movie Sister Act. In 2012, she acted in the Dutch drama  , Stars For Planet Earth and acted in the 2012 film release  as Laetitia Jurna after having appeared in a string of films and TV series in a variety of roles.

In The Voice of Holland
In 2012, she auditioned for season 3 of the Dutch reality television music competition The Voice of Holland with the song "Mesmerized" on the first day of the blind auditions with all four judges, Marco Borsato, Trijntje Oosterhuis, Nick & Simon and Roel van Velzen pressing their "I Want You" buttons and turning their chairs. She chose to be part of Team Trijntje.

Progressing successfully through all rounds, in the final she sang "Could You Be Loved" winning with 54.6% of the public vote against runner up  from Team Nick & Simon with 45.4% of the votes.

Performances 
Blind Audition: "Mesmerized" Result: Team Trijntje
Battle round: "Always There" (facing Gerrie van Dijk-Dantuma). Result: To the live shows
Live show 1: "I Just Want to Make Love to You" (full 10.0 from all four judges)
Live show 3: "Livin' on a Prayer" (average 8.5 from the judges. To next round)
Quarter finals: "Addicted to Love" (9.3 from judges. Total average 74.3. To next round)
Semi-finals: "(You Make Me Feel Like) A Natural Woman" (9.3 from judges. Total average 129.1. Third best overall. To final)
Final: "Could You Be Loved" (winner's song) / "Mesmerized" / "Knocked out" with coach Trijntje Oosterhuis. Result Winner of Voice of Holland with 54.6% of the popular votes

After The Voice of Holland
After winning, she signed a contract with 8ball Music that released her winning song, a Bob Marley cover. Leona's release reached number 2 of the Dutch Top 40 charts and reached number 1 in Dutch Single Top 100 charts.

Discography

Albums
Studio albums
2006: The Official Bootleg Volume 1
2009: Strut It!
Live albums
2010: Concert for Freedom

Singles
(Selective)
2002: "Zomer op je radio / Summer on Your Radio"
2006: "I'd Like to Teach the World to Sing"
2012: "Could You Be Loved" (Winning song in The Voice of Holland)
Other download releases from The Voice of Holland interpretations
2012: "Mesmerized"
2012: "I Just Want to Make Love to You"
2012: "Livin' on a Prayer"
2012: "Addicted to Love"

Filmography
2003: Phileine Says Sorry Joanne
2005: Johan as Hester 
2006: Wild Romance as Bombita 2
2006: Afdwalen (short film)
2007: Alles is Liefde
2008: Ver van familie as Filonia
2010: De gelukkige huisvrouw
2012: De groeten van Mike! as Laetitia Jurna
Television
2004–2005: Het Glazen Huis as Bibi Kruyswijk
2002–2012: Roles in various episodes of Trauma 24/7 (2002), Grijpstra & De Gier' (2004), Man & Paard (2006, Verborgen Gebreken (2010), Lijn 32 (2012)

Theater / Musical theater
 Sinbad the Sailor Wind in the Willow Little Miss Muffet Aida Big, Black & Beautiful Mussen & Zwanen MC Shake Helden (musical)
 Kings & Queens Stars for Planet EarthOthers
 Concert for Freedom The Official Tribute to the Blues Brothers Tribute to Michael Jackson Sister Act'' songs

References

External links

Dutch songwriters
Dutch people of Jamaican descent
Canadian emigrants to the Netherlands
The Voice (franchise) winners
1979 births
Living people
Musicians from Rotterdam
21st-century Dutch singers
21st-century Dutch women singers